Elena Olegovna Nikonova, married surname: Prudsky, is a Russian former pair skater. With her skating partner, Nikolai Apter, she won silver at three senior international competitions – 1991 Skate America, 1991 Grand Prix International St. Gervais, and 1990 Skate Electric. As juniors, they won the gold medal at the 1988 Blue Swords.

Nikonova was born in Leningrad (Saint Petersburg). As of 2017, she is a figure skating coach based in Texas.

References 

1970s births
Russian female pair skaters
Soviet female pair skaters
Living people
Figure skaters from Saint Petersburg
Soviet emigrants to the United States